Coming from the Greek origin, κολακεία, which means flattery, the word "kolakeia" means to flatter someone as a means to take advantage of or gain something from them through speech. Kolakeia's concept is to overload someone with compliments so the speaker can slip in another idea that the listener may not agree upon. It may also include a subtle compliment where the listener does not know it happened but it affects their way of thinking. The use of the kolakeia is often looked down upon because it is not a true concept of speech.  The use of this type of communication, allows people to question the speaker's motives.

An example of Kolakeia in action was Medea's answer when the choir's sympathy asked about the banishment from Creon. She simply answered, "Do you think I would ever flatter this man unless I was scheming or bound to profit in some way?" Medea's flattery towards the king allowed her to ruin her enemies. The harm placed on the enemy was hidden through flattery.

References 

Greek words and phrases
Persuasion techniques